Leptophoca is an extinct genus of earless seals from the North Atlantic realm.

Taxonomy
Leptophoca lenis was coined by Frederick True for a humerus from the Calvert Formation of Maryland. Later, Clayton Ray referred "Prophoca" proxima from the Antwerp region, Belgium, to Leptophoca. A second nominal Leptophoca species, L. amphiatlantica, was coined for specimens found on both sides of the North Atlantic. A 2017 study found proxima and lenis to be the same species, rendering proxima the epithet of the Leptophoca type species, but evidence for the validity of L. amphiatlantica was deemed weak, rendering amphiatlantica a nomen dubium within Leptophoca.

References

Miocene pinnipeds
Phocines
Prehistoric carnivoran genera
Prehistoric pinnipeds of North America
Fossil taxa described in 1906